The Minister of the Interior and Health of Denmark is a member of the Danish cabinet and the head of the Ministry of the Interior and Health.

After the 2007 Folketing elections, the ministry was disbanded, and its areas of responsibility divided between two newly created ministries, the Ministry of Welfare and the Ministry of Health and Prevention. With the announcement of the first Lars Løkke Rasmussen cabinet in 2009, the Ministry of Welfare was abolished and replaced by the Ministry of the Interior and Social Affairs, a de facto re-establishment of two old ministries. Only emancipation affairs were moved to the Ministry of Employment.

See also
List of Interior Ministers (Denmark)

External links
Official website of the Ministry of the Interior and Health

Interior and Health